Parliamentary elections were held in Mauritania on 26 October 1975. The country was a one-party state with the Mauritanian People's Party (PPM) as the sole legal party. It therefore won all 70 seats in the National Assembly. Voter turnout was 87.4%.

Results

References

Mauritania
1975 in Mauritania
Elections in Mauritania
One-party elections
October 1975 events in Africa